Getting Haiti Right This Time: The U.S. and the Coup is a 2004 book by Noam Chomsky, Paul Farmer and Amy Goodman.

References

Books about foreign relations of the United States
History of Haiti
2004 non-fiction books
Haiti–United States relations
Books about Haiti